Lieberknecht is a German compound surname, where Lieber is derived from the given name Liebert, and kneckt is an occupational surname for a journeyman, from the Middle Low German knecht, meaning "knight’s assistant" or "servant". The name may refer to:

Christine Lieberknecht (born 1958), German politician 
Torsten Lieberknecht (born 1973), German football player and manager

See also
Knecht

References

German-language surnames